Charles Stephen Longuet (1861 – 10 October 1941) was the 27th Mayor of Invercargill from 1901 to 1902, and from 1909 to 1910. He had been on the Borough Council since 1897.

He was born in Bluff and educated in Invercargill. A lawyer, he was called to the bar in 1890 and had been the President of the Law Society.

References 
 

Cyclopaedia of New Zealand (1905); reference to Councillors Longuet and Lillicrap

1861 births
1941 deaths
Mayors of Invercargill
19th-century New Zealand lawyers
People from Bluff, New Zealand
Burials at St John's Cemetery, Invercargill
20th-century New Zealand lawyers